The 1908–09 United States Senate elections were held on various dates in various states. As these U.S. Senate elections were prior to the ratification of the Seventeenth Amendment in 1913, senators were primarily chosen by state legislatures. Senators were elected over a wide range of time throughout 1906 and 1907, and a seat may have been filled months late or remained vacant due to legislative deadlock. However, some states had already begun direct elections during this time. Oregon pioneered direct election and experimented with different measures over several years until it succeeded in 1907. Soon after, Nebraska followed suit and laid the foundation for other states to adopt measures reflecting the people's will. By 1912, as many as 29 states elected senators either as nominees of their party's primary or in conjunction with a general election.

The 31 Class 3 seats were up for election, as well as various special elections to fill vacancies or confirm appointments. The Republicans lost two seats overall.

In Illinois and Florida, the legislature failed to elect until after the beginning of the 61st Congress on March 4.

Results summary 
Senate party division, 61st Congress (1909–1911)

 Majority party: Republican (60 seats)
 Minority party: Democratic (32 seats)
 Other parties: 0
 Total seats: 92

Change in composition

Before the elections 
After the January 21, 1908 special election in Rhode Island.

Result of the general elections

Race summaries

Special elections during the 60th Congress 
In this election, the winner was seated in 1908 before March 4; ordered by state.

In this election, the winner was elected three years early, to be seated in the 62nd Congress starting March 4, 1911.

Races leading to the 61st Congress 

In these regular elections, the winners were elected for the term beginning March 4, 1909; ordered by state.

All of the elections involved the Class 3 seats.

Elections during the 61st Congress 
In these elections, the winners were elected in 1909 after March 4; ordered by date.

Maryland

Maryland (special) 

William Pinkney Whyte was elected by an unknown margin, for the Class 3 seat.

Maryland (regular) 

William Pinkney Whyte died, and John Walter Smith was elected by an unknown margin, for the Class 3 seat.

New York 

The election was held on January 19, 1909, by the New York State Legislature. Republican Thomas C. Platt had been re-elected to this seat in 1903, and his term would expire on March 3, 1909. At the State election in November 1908, 35 Republicans and 16 Democrats were elected for a two-year term (1909–1910) in the state senate; and 99 Republicans and 51 Democrats were elected for the session of 1909 to the Assembly. The 132nd New York State Legislature met from January 5 to April 30, 1909, at Albany, New York.

The Republican caucus met on January 18. State Senator J. Mayhew Wainwright presided. The caucus nominated U.S. Secretary of State Elihu Root unanimously. Root was the choice of President Theodore Roosevelt. President pro tempore of the State Senate John Raines lauded warmly Root's nomination, eulogized the retiring U.S. Senator Platt, and declared war on Governor Charles Evans Hughes's reforms. The Democratic caucus met also on January 18. They nominated Ex-Lieutenant Governor Lewis S. Chanler unanimously. Chanler had been elected lieutenant governor in 1906 on the Democratic/Independence League ticket, and had served under Republican governor Hughes. Chanler had just been defeated when running against Hughes for governor in November 1908.

Elihu Root was the choice of both the Assembly and the state senate, and was declared elected.

Note: The votes were cast on January 19, but both Houses met in a joint session on January 20 to compare nominations, and declare the result.

Pennsylvania

Pennsylvania (regular) 

The regularly-scheduled general election in Pennsylvania was held January 19, 1909. Boies Penrose was re-elected by the Pennsylvania General Assembly. This was the last Class III U.S. Senate election to be decided by the Pennsylvania General Assembly before the ratification of the 17th Amendment to the U.S. Constitution, which mandated direct election of U.S. Senators.

The Pennsylvania General Assembly, consisting of the House of Representatives and the Senate, convened on January 19, 1909, to elect a senator to fill the term beginning on March 4, 1909. Incumbent Republican Boies Penrose, who was elected in 1897 and re-elected in 1903, was a successful candidate for re-election to another term. The results of the vote of both houses combined are as follows:

|- bgcolor="#EEEEEE"
| colspan=3 align="right" | Totals
| align="right" | 257
| align="right" | 100.00%

Pennsylvania (special) 

A special election was held March 16, 1909. George T. Oliver was elected by the Pennsylvania General Assembly.

Republican Philander C. Knox was appointed to the Senate in June 1904 after the death of Matthew Quay. Knox was subsequently elected to a full term in the Senate by the Pennsylvania General Assembly, consisting of the House of Representatives and the Senate, in January 1905. Knox served in the U.S. Senate until his resignation on March 4, 1909, to become United States Secretary of State in the William Howard Taft administration, leaving the seat vacant until a successor was elected.

Following Knox's resignation, the Pennsylvania General Assembly convened on March 16, 1909, to elect a new senator to fill the vacancy. The results of the vote of both houses combined are as follows:

|- bgcolor="#EEEEEE"
| colspan=3 align="right" | Totals
| align="right" | 257
| align="right" | 100.00%

See also 
 1908 United States elections
 1908 United States House of Representatives elections
 1908 United States presidential election
 60th United States Congress
 61st United States Congress

Notes

References
 
 
 
 
 
  (alternate url: https://books.google.com/books?id=EI03AAAAMAAJ, via Google Books)